Hartmut Ehrig (born 6 December 1944 in Angermünde; died 17 March 2016) was a German computer scientist and professor of theoretical computer science and formal specification. He was a pioneer in algebraic specification of abstract data types, and in graph grammars.

Vita
In 1969, Ehrig received his diploma in mathematics from the Technical University (TU) of Berlin.
In 1971, he earned his doctorate, and in 1974 his habilitation from the same university.
Subsequently, he had research stays at the Thomas J. Watson Research Center, among others. 
In 1976, he became a lecturer at the TU Berlin, and the director of its Institute for Software Engineering and Theoretical Computer Science. 
In 1984, he was appointed full professor at the TU Berlin.
Between 1981 and 1991, he was also Dean of its Department of Computer Science for several periods.
He was EATCS Vice President from 1997 to 2002.
He retired on 1 October 2010.

Selected publications

References

External links
 
  
 Vita at TU Berlin — contains a portrait photo

1944 births
2016 deaths
German computer scientists
Technical University of Berlin alumni
Academic staff of the Technical University of Berlin